Nirvaan Nadeem is a Pakistani actor, director and founder/director of Ajoka Institute. As an actor, he has worked on television and theater. He appeared in several Urdu television series including Mohabbat Jaye Bhar Mein, Sehra Teri Pyas and Behkawa, feature film "Baaji" as well as numerous projects for ISPR including "Ehd-e-Wafa", Shezad Roy/Ayesha Omer music video "Meray Dhol Sipahiya" and drama series "Sehra Teri Pyaas" for Pakistan Rangers.

Career 
The son of playwright, former PTV Deputy MD Shahid Nadeem and TV/theater Director and Ajoka Theatre founder Madeeha Gauhar, Nadeem made his debut from PTV as an actor. He first played the leading role in PTV's Sehra Teri Pyas alongside Sanam Baloch.

He also worked in theater as an actor and director and remained associated with Ajoka Theater which was founded by his mother in 1984.

Filmography

References 

21st-century Pakistani male actors
Living people
Year of birth missing (living people)